Point Blank is the first and only studio album by Australian band Electric Pandas. The album was released in September 1985 by Regular Records and peaked at No. 22 on the Australian Album Charts.

Regular Records re-issued the album on CD for release in 1993, however very few copies are known to exist and it is now one of the most collectible albums on CD by an Australian Band, generally fetching over AU$1000 on sites such as ebay on the rare occasion that it has surfaced for sale. The album was also released digitally by Laneway Music in 2016.

Track listing
 LP (L 38437)

Weekly charts

References

1985 debut albums
Electric Pandas albums